Goose Island  is an island owned by Stratford, Connecticut below I-95 in the Housatonic River. The island is currently a set of three islets due to erosion running north–south near the Stratford bank of the river. The island is south-southwest of the Washington Bridge, roughly parallel to Housatonic Avenue.

Physical description
   
 Elevation: c.

Transportation
All transportation to and from the island is by boat.

Notes

Landforms of Fairfield County, Connecticut
Stratford, Connecticut
River islands of Connecticut